was a train station in Kushiro, Hokkaidō, Japan. It was closed and became a signal point on March 16, 2019.

Lines
Hokkaido Railway Company
Nemuro Main Line Station K44

Adjacent stations

References

Railway stations in Hokkaido Prefecture
Railway stations in Japan opened in 1920